Alto Lindoso Dam is a concrete double curvature arch dam on the Lima River. It is located in the municipality Ponte da Barca, in Viana do Castelo District, Portugal. The dam lies in Peneda-Gerês National Park close to the border with Spain. The reservoir created by the dam is known as Alto Lindoso reservoir or Lindoso reservoir.

History
Construction of the dam began in 1983. On 15 August 1991 the land behind the dam lying in Spain was compulsorily acquired by Portuguese company EDP (Electricidade de Portugal), based on an old deal between dictators General Franco of Spain and António de Oliveira Salazar of Portugal. Residents of the five villages which were going to be drowned by the dam, Aceredo, Buscalque, O Bao, A Reloeira and Lantemil, supported by left-leaning political parties, immediately began protests against the building of the dam, including a ten-day hunger strike. In the end, with no option but to move, the residents of Aceredo (a town with 70 houses and 120 citizens) relocated bodies from their cemetery, and a historic church was moved to a different town. Some moved to nearby villages, others far away.
 
The dam was completed in 1992 and drowned the five villages. It is owned by Companhia Portuguesa de Produção de Electricidade (CPPE). The dam is used for power production.

Dam

The dam contains two shaft spillways with three gates each (combined maximum discharge /s) and two bottom outlets (combined maximum discharge /s).

Reservoir
At full reservoir level of 338 m (maximum flood level of 339 m) the reservoir of the dam has a surface area of 10.72 km² and its total capacity is 379.01 million m³. Its active capacity is 347.91 (270) million m³. Minimum operating level is 280 m. With the 347.9 million m³ of water, 224.6 GWh of electricity can be produced.

The formerly drowned village of Aceredo in 2022 emerged again after prolonged drought.

Power plant 
The pumped-storage hydroelectric power plant went operational in 1992. It is owned by CPPE, but operated by EDP. The plant has a nameplate capacity of 630 (634) MW. Its average annual generation is somewhat more than 900 GWh.

The power station contains 2 Francis turbine-generators of 317 MW (350 MVA) each in an underground powerhouse 340 m below the surface. The turbine rotates at 214.3 rpm. The minimum hydraulic head is 227 m, the maximum 288 m. Maximum flow per turbine is 125 m³/s.

As lower reservoir for Alto Lindoso the reservoir of Touvedo dam is used, which is connected via a tailrace tunnel with a length of 4,883 m.

See also

 List of power stations in Portugal
 List of dams and reservoirs in Portugal

References

Dams in Portugal
Pumped-storage hydroelectric power stations in Portugal
Arch dams
Dams completed in 1992
Energy infrastructure completed in 1992
1992 establishments in Portugal
Buildings and structures in Viana do Castelo District
Reservoirs in Portugal
Lima River
Ponte da Barca